Reinbold is a surname. Notable people with the surname include:

Jennifer Mundel-Reinbold
Leo M. Reinbold (1933–2010), American politician
Lora Reinbold (born 1964), American politician

See also

Reinebold
Reinhold
Reibold
Rimbaud (surname)
Raimbaud
Raimbaut
Regenbald
Regimbald
Dreyer & Reinbold Racing